Samantha Marie Sprackling (born 3 June 1968), commonly known as Saffron, is a Nigerian-British singer, songwriter, actress and the lead singer of the electronic / alternative rock band Republica. She also performs solo and appeared in London's  Starlight Express for two years.

Early life and career
Samantha Sprackling was born in Lagos, Nigeria. Her mother was half-Chinese and half-Portuguese and lived in Hong Kong. When she was 18, Sprackling successfully auditioned for Arlene Philips for a part in the musical Starlight Express.

Sprackling began singing with N-Joi (their featured vocalist on their 1990 single, "Anthem"), the Shamen, and Jah Wobble. She appeared in the music video for the Chesney Hawkes 1991 hit, "The One and Only", and as a dancer in the music video for N-Joi's single "Mindflux". Saffron then had a brief career as a solo artist, with one of her singles - a cover of Atlantic Starr's Circles - charting at #60 in the UK in 1993.

Republica 
Sprackling met Republica keyboard players Tim Dorney and Andy Todd by 1994, and they started writing songs after recruiting a guitarist and drummer. Republica released two albums and disbanded in 2001 after their record label, Deconstruction Records, collapsed.

In 2010, Republica reformed and released a re-recording of their 1996 hit "Ready to Go" on 7 June 2010. During early October and November 2014, Republica toured the United Kingdom in support of the Boomtown Rats "Ratlife" tour.

Other work
Sprackling worked with the Cure, appearing on the track "Just Say Yes". She had previously featured on the Prodigy's cover of L7's "Fuel My Fire" (from their 1997 album, The Fat of the Land); Deepsky's "Smile" (from the 2002 album, In Silico); Jeff Beck's "Pork-U-Pine" (from the 2003 album, Jeff) and Junkie XL's songs, "Crusher", "Spirits", and "Beauty Never Fades" (from his 2003 album, Radio JXL: A Broadcast from the Computer Hell Cabin).

On 13 November 2015, Saffron performed a solo show at the 100 Club, London. She performed with guitarist Darren Beale and fellow singer Mel Sanson. She continues to tour both with Republica and with her solo show, which incorporates special guests.

In April 2016, Saffron assembled a full solo band consisting of Tony Feedback (Angelic Upstarts, Sham 69, Urban Dogs, UK Subs) on guitar, Piers Gielgud (Meat Beat Manifesto) on bass, Brad Walkhouse on saxophone/horns and Josh Collins (Reverbed) on drums. The lineup also occasionally includes Darren Beale (Boomtown Rats) on guitar. The band debuted at Polyfest 3 playing a mix of X-ray Spex classics and Republica hits.

In June 2022 Saffron took part in the Electric Ladies tour along with Toyah and Lene Lovich. A proportion of the income from the tour goes towards Hazel O'Connor to help her ongoing recovery from ill health.

Saffron now works as a mental health nurse as well as continuing to perform with Republica and as a solo artist.

Discography

Solo singles 
 "Solitaire" (1992)
 "Losing Control" (1992)
 "One Love" (1992)
 "Circles" (1993) - UK #60
 "World of You" (1993)
 "Fluffy Toy" (1993)

References

1968 births
Living people
English dance musicians
English people of Chinese descent
English people of Portuguese descent
English stage actresses
Women rock singers
Musicians from Lagos
21st-century English women singers
21st-century English singers
English women in electronic music